Curculionichthys luteofrenatus is a species of catfish in the family Loricariidae. It is native to Brazil, where it occurs in the headwaters of the Tapajós basin. It occurs in flat shallow areas with sandy substrate and low current. The species reaches 3.1 cm (1.2 inches) SL.

References 

Loricariidae
Fish described in 2007